"Superluv!" is a song by American YouTuber Shane Dawson. It was written by Dawson, Eric Goldman and Michael Corcoran, and produced by Goldman and Corcoran. Dawson announced the recording and producing of the song in vlogs posted on his YouTube channel. The song was leaked online on March 30, 2012

Credits and personnel
Producers – Eric Goldman and Michael Corcoran
Lyrics – Shane Dawson, Eric Goldman and Michael Corcoran
Composer – Eric Goldman and Michael Corcoran

Chart performance

References

2012 singles
2012 songs
Shane Dawson